The 2015 West Coast Conference women's basketball tournament was held March 5–10, 2015, at Orleans Arena in the Las Vegas Valley community of Paradise, Nevada. Seeds were determined based on a schools conference record, not the overall record. The winner received the conference's automatic bid to the 2015 NCAA Division I women's basketball tournament.

Seeds
WCC tiebreaker procedures went as follows:
Head-to-head
Better record against a higher seed
Higher RPI

Schedule

Bracket and scores
All BYUtv games were simulcast online and streamed at TheW.tv.

Game Summaries

Loyola Marymount vs. Pepperdine
Series History: Loyola Marymount leads 52-20
Broadcasters: Spencer Linton & Kristen Kozlowski

Santa Clara vs. Portland
Series History: Santa Clara leads 37-30
Broadcasters: Spencer Linton & Kristen Kozlowski

Pacific vs. San Francisco
Series History: San Francisco leads 16-15
Broadcasters: Dave McCann & Blaine Fowler

Saint Mary's vs. BYU
Series History: Saint Mary's leads 5-4
Broadcasters: Dave McCann & Blaine Fowler

Gonzaga vs. Loyola Marymount
Series History: Gonzaga leads 33-27
Broadcasters: Spencer Linton & Kristen Kozlowski

San Diego vs. Santa Clara
Series History: San Diego leads 35-32
Broadcasters: Spencer Linton & Kristen Kozlowski

BYU vs. Gonzaga
Series History: Gonzaga leads 11-6
Broadcasters: Dave McCann & Blaine Fowler

San Diego vs. San Francisco
Series History: San Diego leads 38-25
Broadcasters: Dave McCann & Blaine Fowler

WCC Championship: San Francisco vs. BYU
Series History: BYU leads series 12-2
Broadcasters: Beth Mowins & Katie Smith (ESPNU)
Dave McCann & Blaine Fowler; Spencer Linton & Ben Bagley–Halftime (BYU Radio)

All-Tournament team
Player, School, Yr., Pos.
Lexi Eaton, BYU, Jr., G (Most Outstanding Player)
Morgan Bailey, BYU, RS Sr., F
Makenzi Morrison, BYU, RS So., G
Taj Winston, San Francisco, Sr., G
Sunny Greinacher, Gonzaga, Sr., F

See also
2014–15 NCAA Division I women's basketball season
West Coast Conference men's basketball tournament
2015 West Coast Conference men's basketball tournament
2014–15 West Coast Conference women's basketball season
West Coast Conference women's basketball tournament

References

External links

Tournament
West Coast Conference women's basketball tournament
West Coast Conference women's basketball tournament
West Coast Conference women's basketball tournament
Basketball competitions in the Las Vegas Valley
College basketball tournaments in Nevada
Women's sports in Nevada
College sports tournaments in Nevada